"Lalala" is a song by American producer Y2K and Canadian rapper bbno$, released as a single on June 7, 2019, by Columbia Records. The music video was released on August 20, 2019.

The song became viral on the video sharing platform TikTok due to its catchline: "Did I really just forget that melody?"

Background
To promote the release of the song, Y2K and bbno$ created fake stories about how they met and made the song, sending them to blogs including Lyrical Lemonade. A remix version featuring Spanish singer Enrique Iglesias and Canadian singer Carly Rae Jepsen was released on October 30, 2019. The song is in D Phrygian and is played at a tempo of 130 BPM.

Critical reception
Carl Lamarre of Billboard called the track a "fun-filled tune" with bbno$'s "outlandish" rapping over the "Latin-tinged record".

Chart performance
It is the first song to chart for either of the duo, debuting at number 84 on the US Billboard Hot 100 before peaking at number 55. On December 1, 2020, the song was certified double platinum by the Recording Industry Association of America for equivalent sales of 2,000,000 units in the United States.

Music video
The official video of the song was released on Y2K's channel on August 20, 2019, on YouTube. The video consists of a filming studio for a kid's educational show, as demonstrated by the diverse props and scenarios present. As the video progresses, both artists begins using the different objects from the kids' show to continue with the song, like a puppet theatre, a different wallpapers and studio spaces, and a globe to point at locations.

Charts

Weekly charts

Year-end charts

Certifications

References

2019 singles
2019 songs
Bbno$ songs
Carly Rae Jepsen songs
Enrique Iglesias songs
Songs written by Bbno$
Songs written by Y2K (record producer)
Y2K (record producer) songs
Viral videos